The Hunter 386 is an American sailboat, that was designed by the Hunter Design Team and first built in 1999.

The Hunter 386 shares a common hull with the Hunter 376 and the Hunter 380.

Production
The boat was built by Hunter Marine in the United States, starting in 1999, but it is now out of production.

Design
The Hunter 386 is a small recreational keelboat, built predominantly of fiberglass, with no external wood trim. It has a B&R rig sloop configuration, a roller furling jib, internally mast-furling mainsail, an internally-mounted spade-type rudder and a fixed fin keel.

It displaces  and carries  of ballast with the standard keel and displaces  and carries  of ballast with the standard keel.

See also
List of sailing boat types

Related development
Hunter 38
Hunter 376
Hunter 380

Similar sailboats
Alajuela 38
C&C 38
Catalina 38
Catalina 375
Eagle 38
Farr 38
Landfall 38
Sabre 38
Shannon 38
Yankee 38

References

External links

Keelboats
1990s sailboat type designs
Sailing yachts
Sailboat types built by Hunter Marine
Sailboat type designs by Hunter Design Team